The State Road and Tollway Authority (SRTA) is a government agency of the U.S. state of Georgia. It is responsible for financing transportation initiatives and operating the state's toll roads.  

A proposal to merge SRTA and GRTA, and most of GDOT's functions into a new State Transportation Authority was presented in the 150th Georgia General Assembly, however later in the legislative session a much more moderate plan was passed in March 2009, instead.

See also

References

External links
 State Road and Tollway Authority homepage
 Cruise Card information

Toll road authorities of the United States
Toll roads in Georgia (U.S. state)
Government of Georgia (U.S. state)